The Rattal are a Hindu Rajput caste found in Jammu and Kashmir, India, who are of Suryavanshi clan. According to the 2001 Census of India, their population was 1,913.

Origin 
They live in the warm and temperate zones of Jammu province in the districts of Kathua, Udhampur, and Reasi.

Present circumstances 

The Rattal are strictly endogamous and practice clan exogamy. Their main include the Sargotra, Lakkotra, Mootan, Kath, Kulsota and Sundeh. They do not have an informal caste council, which distinguishes them from other Jammu Hindus who tend have elaborate caste councils.

The Rattal have now become landowners, as a result of the land reforms, and the bulk of them are small and marginal farmers. A small minority are still employed as agricultural labourers or involved the manufacture of baskets. The decades since independence in 1947 has seen major changes in their socio-economic status, but they socially they are still perceived as untouchables.

See also 

Saryara

References 

Dalit communities
Scheduled Castes of Jammu and Kashmir
Hindu communities